Deanna "Di" Coates MBE (born 23 May 1954) is a sport shooter who has competed in eight Paralympic Games winning three gold medals.

Personal life
Coates was born on 23 May 1954 and lives in Hampshire.

Sporting career
Coates started training in 1978, joining the Rushmoor Mallards Sports Club, a club based in Farnborough, and offering a wide range of disabled sport . Coates first represented Great Britain at the Paralympic Games in 1984, entering four air rifle events (prone, 3 positions, kneeling, and standing) winning two silver medals and a bronze. It would prove to be the start of a lengthy international career.

At the 1988 Games in Seoul Coates competed in the same four events, winning her first Paralympic gold in the standing shoot. She won another gold medal in Barcelona in 1992, then a gold and a silver in Atlanta 1996. Her final medal came at the 2000 Games in Sydney where she won a bronze, and though she has competed in the 2004, 2008, and 2012 Games she has been unable to finish in a medal-scoring position. Coates also won titles and medals in other events, including the IPC World Championships and Shooting World Cups.

By competing in eight different Games Coates is Britain's most experienced Paralympian. As she competed at the 1984 Games in Stoke Mandeville Coates was also the only member of the 2012 British Olympic/Paralympic team to have previously competed at a home Games.

Coates was shortlisted for the 2012 Whang Youn Dai Achievement Award, given at the end of each Paralympic Games to a competitor who has shown themselves to be "fair, honest and uncompromising in his or her values, and prioritises the promotion of the Paralympic Movement above personal recognition".

Coates is now working as a coach, helping young people get into sport shooting.

References

1954 births
Living people
British female sport shooters
Paralympic shooters of Great Britain
Paralympic gold medalists for Great Britain
Paralympic silver medalists for Great Britain
Paralympic bronze medalists for Great Britain
Paralympic medalists in shooting
Shooters at the 1984 Summer Paralympics
Shooters at the 1988 Summer Paralympics
Shooters at the 1992 Summer Paralympics
Shooters at the 1996 Summer Paralympics
Shooters at the 2000 Summer Paralympics
Shooters at the 2004 Summer Paralympics
Shooters at the 2008 Summer Paralympics
Shooters at the 2012 Summer Paralympics
Medalists at the 1984 Summer Paralympics
Medalists at the 1988 Summer Paralympics
Medalists at the 1992 Summer Paralympics
Medalists at the 1996 Summer Paralympics
Medalists at the 2000 Summer Paralympics
Members of the Order of the British Empire
20th-century British women
21st-century British women